Jeungsan Station is a station on the Busan Metro Line 2 in Mulgeum-eup, Yangsan, South Gyeongsang, South Korea.

Station periphery 
Jeungsan-ri
Yangsan Daebang Nobland Third Session
Yangsan Daebang Nobland Secondary Session
Gachon-ri
 Lapiesta Yangsan

History 
Jan. 10, 2008: Operating as an uninterrupted transit station with the opening of Busan Metro Line 2

September 24, 2015: Start of business

References

External links
  Cyber station information from Busan Transportation Corporation
 :ko:%EC%A6%9D%EC%82%B0%EC%97%AD (%EC%96%91%EC%82%B0)

Metro stations in Yangsan